Plocamium is a genus of red algae in the family Plocamiaceae. It contains around 40 species and has a cosmopolitan distribution in temperate seas, although it is most diverse in the southern hemisphere. It is widely distributed in tropical and also warm-temperate and cold-temperate seas, such as northern Europe, the northern Arabian Sea and western Australia. They are also found in the Antarctic regions of Admiralty Bay (maritime Antarctica, Antarctic Peninsula) and Terra Nova Bay (in the Ross Sea).

Description
They are bright red in color with strongly flattened delicately branching fronds that further divide into two to five smaller branchlets.
Cystocarps (fruiting parts) are either scattered along the frond margins or found on special short fertile branches, and lack a specialized pore for carpospore release. Tetrasporangia are borne in specialized stichidia (branches of the thallus) of various morphologies.

Accepted species
Species classified under the genus include the following:
Plocamium affine Kützing, 1849 
Plocamium angustum (J.Agardh) J.D.Hooker & Harvey, 1847 
Plocamium beckeri F.Schmitz ex Simons, 1964 
Plocamium brachiocarpum Kützing, 1849
Plocamium brasiliense (Greville) M.A.Howe & W.R.Taylor, 1931
Plocamium cartilagineum (Linnaeus) P.S.Dixon, 1967
Plocamium cirrhosum (Turner) M.J.Wynne, 2002
Plocamium corallorhiza (Turner) J.D.Hooker & Harvey, 1845
Plocamium cornutum (Turner) Harvey, 1849
Plocamium cruciferum Harvey, 1855
Plocamium delicatulum Baardseth, 1941
Plocamium dilatatum J.Agardh, 1876
Plocamium fimbriatum M.J.Wynne, 2002
Plocamium fuscorubrum Baardseth, 1941
Plocamium glomeratum J.Agardh, 1851
Plocamium hamatum J.Agardh, 1876
Plocamium hookeri Harvey, 1845
Plocamium leptophyllum Kützing, 1849
Plocamium maggsiae G.W.Saunders & K.V.Lehmkuhl, 2005
Plocamium maxillosum (Poiret) J.V.Lamouroux, 1813
Plocamium mertensii (Greville) Harvey, 1847
Plocamium microcladioides G.R.South & N.M.Adams, 1979
Plocamium minutum Levring, 1944
Plocamium nanum G.W.Saunders & K.V.Lehmkuhl, 2005
Plocamium oregonum Doty, 1947
Plocamium ovicornis Okamura, 1896
Plocamium patagiatum J.Agardh, 1894
Plocamium patens G.Martens, 1868
Plocamium preissianum Sonder, 1845
Plocamium raphelisianum P.J.L.Dangeard, 1949
Plocamium recurvatum Okamura, 1913
Plocamium rigidum Bory de Saint-Vincent, 1834
Plocamium sandvicense J.Agardh, 1892
Plocamium secundatum(Kützing) Kützing, 1866
Plocamium serratulum Okamura
Plocamium serrulatumOkamura, 1932
Plocamium suhrii Kützing, 1849
Plocamium telfairiae (W.J.Hooker & Harvey) Harvey ex Kützing, 1849
Plocamium violaceum Farlow, 1877

Nomina dubia:
Plocamium concinnum Areschoug 
Plocamium froelichianum Kützing 
Plocamium subtile Kützing, 1866

References

Red algae genera
Florideophyceae